Manic Depressive Psychosis (also known as MDP) was an Armenian rock group established in 1990 at the Yerevan State University.
Their début album Usurper of the Sun Rays was self-released on an MC-cassette in 1993. It presented a very particular brew that incorporated elements of heavy and at the same time psychedelic music based on sound experimentation. It was hypnotic, heavy and sophisticated.
In 1994, the group might have split, but two musicians of a respected mainstream heavy-metal outfit—Soma—made the band live on.
Same year the MDP recorded at Asparez studio their first prog-suite—the River—which today is mentioned in all anthologies of Armenian rock.
Next few years the band spent in Russia and released their another album, Take Your Nibbled Apple Back, which boasted eerie vocal experimentations with female vocals.
In 2002, the MDP recorded a very unexpected single, "Falling in Love/Should I", which incorporated trip-hop elements, but this was short-lived, since the reviews in British and American press would stress that they are particularly great at playing heavier stuff than Portishead/Sylvian moods.
Upon opening its own studio, in 2003 and 2004, MDP produced a range of events themselves: festivals MindPower, concerts and gigs for other popular Armenian rock-bands. They again play very heavy music, close to sympho-rock, though it is always difficult to describe their music. Recent reviews from OverHook Music tell that they have stylistic resemblance with Dream Theatre, while others recommend to remember Mars Volta. They deservedly attracted attention of German independent promoters and concerted in Dresden in 2005.
Now the band also stands as producer of numerous rock-concerts and rock-festivals in Armenia. Vibrographus Studio, headed by band members, boasts the best hardware in Yerevan for production of rock events. One of the band's 2008 offspring is the Dogma project, which features female vocals augmented with the band's bass and guitar.

Recordings 
1993, Usurper of the Sun Rays (Tape, Live-in-studio, MDP, Armenia)
1995, Take Your Nibbled Apple Back (CD, Live-in-studio, Rostov/Russia)
2000, Vibrographus (CD, MDP Studio, Armenia)
2003, MDP Live (CD, Live/Recording at the "FireWall" and "MinDPower" Rock Festivals, Armenia)
2005, Beauty (EP, MDP Studio, Armenia)

Singles and Compilations 
1994, The River (Tape, Asparez Studio, Single, Armenia)
1995, "Вечера Прогрессивной Музыки" (CD, Live/Recording at the "ProgMusic Festival", Moscow/Russia)
2002, This is MDP (CD, MDP Studio, compilation, Armenia)
2002, Falling in Love (CD, MDP Studio)

Excerpts from reviews 
OverhookMusic.
"...this band could gain lots of fans from the Western world, if people only knew about their existence and the music that they play..."

Notes from Haireniq.
"Their sound is definitely hard, but cannot be compared with what can be heard from “System of a Down”— in fact I would argue that MDP is a much better band musically speaking. " By Christian Garbis

Classic Rock Society.
If this band were American or British they would be making some impact in the metal area of rock. You might not believe how good the band is until you hear them simply because it may come natural to perceive that there are no good Armenian heavy rock bands. Just shows how wrong a perception can be, doesn't it.
By Martin Hudson, CRS Managing Director/Magazine Editor

Armenian musical groups
Armenian rock music groups
Soviet rock music groups